KBTP (101.1 FM, "The Bull") is a country music formatted broadcast radio station.  The station is licensed to Mertzon, Texas and serves San Angelo and the Concho Valley in Texas.  KBTP is owned and operated by Waco Entertainment Group, LLC.

References

External links
101.1 The Bull on Facebook

2016 establishments in Texas
Country radio stations in the United States
Radio stations established in 2016
BTP